Eurychoria is a genus of moths in the family Geometridae erected by Louis Beethoven Prout in 1916.

Species
Eurychoria oenoptila Prout, 1916 New Guinea
Eurychoria perata Prout, 1928 Sumatra, Java
Eurychoria pia West, 1929 Luzon in the Philippines
Eurychoria trajecta Prout, 1932 Borneo, Peninsular Malaysia
Eurychoria gerasphora (Turner, 1947) Australia
Eurychoria fictilis (Turner, 1919) Australia

References

Baptini